Fritz Gustav Anton Kraemer (July 3, 1908 – September 8, 2003) was an American military educator and advisor.

Biography
Kraemer was born in Essen, Germany, the eldest child of Jewish parents Georg Kraemer (born Berlin 1872, died Theresienstadt 1942)  and Anna Johanna (Jennie) Kraemer, née Goldschmidt (born Essen 1886, died Washington DC 1971) and studied at the famous Arndt Gymnasium in Berlin, the London School of Economics and the Universities of Geneva and Frankfurt before earning a doctorate in law at the University of Frankfurt in 1931 and a doctorate in Political Science at the University of Rome in 1934.

During most of the 1930s he was Senior Legal Advisor to the League of Nations at the League’s Legal Institute in Rome. In 1933, he married his wife, Britta Bjorkander, a Swedish citizen.

Kraemer, a Lutheran with a dislike for Nazis, escaped Nazi Germany for America in 1939, leaving behind his wife and son. He was drafted and became a U.S. citizen as an inductee and joined the United States Army in April 1943 ("with two PhDs and one monocle") as an infantryman in the 84th Infantry Division (the "Railsplitter"). His time served at Camp Ritchie classifies him as one of the thousands of Ritchie Boys.

Kraemer fought in the Battle of the Bulge and in the battles of the Ruhr and Rhineland, earning a Battlefield Commission and a Bronze Star in the liberation of his former homeland. In 1945 Kraemer was reunited with his wife and son and returned to Washington, DC, in 1947. He left active duty in 1948 and retired from the Army Reserve in 1963 with the rank of lieutenant colonel.

A gifted talent scout and teacher, in 1944 he discovered young Henry Kissinger, whom Kraemer had recruited into Army division. Kraemer persuaded Kissinger to attend Harvard University. "Kraemer shaped my reading and thinking, influenced my choice of college, awakened my interest in political philosophy and history, inspired both my undergraduate and graduate theses and became an integral and indispensable part of my life" Kissinger said. 

In 1961 Kraemer also discovered Alexander Haig, and in 1969 Kraemer recommended Haig as the Military Assistant to then National Security Advisor Kissinger. Sven Kraemer, Fritz G. A. Kraemer's son, also served in the Nixon-Kissinger National Security Council.

From the early 1950s until 1978, when Kraemer retired from civil service, he served as Senior Civilian Advisor to the U.S. Army Chief of Staff in the Pentagon and influenced the Department of Defense during the Cold War. During his time at the Pentagon, he also influenced Secretaries of Defense James R. Schlesinger and Donald Rumsfeld. He served on the White House national security staff under 10 presidents. Kraemer was described as the father of the neo-conservative movement in US foreign policy. Kraemer was unswerving in his contempt for “provocative weakness,” warning that U.S. military weakness invites aggression by America’s enemies. He also railed against forsaking one’s principles through compromise or conciliation. 

A graduate of the U.S. National War College, Kraemer advised, taught, and inspired generations of officers, officials, American Presidents, as well as private citizens. 

Kraemer was described as the real Dr Strangelove and Kissinger's Kissinger. He was always flamboyant and eccentric. Kraemer wore a monocle and it became his trademark. Through the cumulative force of his personality, intellect, experience, and encyclopedic knowledge of history and current events, Kraemer shaped the thinking of military leaders and policy makers in the United States and overseas for over half a century. His unbending distrust of Soviet communism influenced the toughened anticommunist policies of the Reagan administration that helped to end the cold war. 

In 2001, Kraemer and Dr Hubertus Hoffmann founded The World Security Network Foundation, a think-tank for global affairs in New York, with 22 generals and admirals. The WSN became one of the largest think-tanks in global affairs. 

Kraemer died at the age of 95 on September 8, 2003, in Washington, D.C., and was buried with full military honors in Arlington National Cemetery on October 8. He was honored by former Secretary of Defense James R. Schlesinger and his former students Henry Kissinger and Alexander Haig. “He stimulated my thoughts because he had all these experiences and insights,” Schlesinger said. Former Secretary of Defence Donald Rumsfeld referred Kramer as "a true keeper of the flame". Kissinger has said that Kraemer was "the greatest single influence of my formative years. An extraordinary man who will be part of my life as long as I draw breath."

Publications
 True Keeper of the Holy Flame - The Legacy of Pentagon Strategist and Mentor Dr Fritz Kraemer, by Hubertus Hoffmann with contributions from Henry Kissinger, Alexander Haig, Donald Rumsfeld, and others. 384 pages, Verlag Inspiration Un Limited, London/Berlin 2012, . 
 Fritz Kraemer on Excellence, by Hubertus Hoffmann with contributions from Henry Kissinger, Alexander Haig, Donald Rumsfeld, and others. New York: World Security Network Foundation, 2004. 
 The Forty Years War, by Len Colodny and Tom Shachtman. New York: Harper/Collins, 2009.

References

Further reading
 Ideology of Fritz Kraemer at the Heart of Wartime Policy from Vietnam to the Present. Nixontapes.org. Retrieved 2022-28-8.
 Strategic Weapons in Changing World. C-SPAN. Retrieved 2022-28-8.
 Fritz Kraemer on Excellence. The World Security Network Foundation. Retrieved 2022-28-8.

1908 births
2003 deaths
Alumni of the London School of Economics
American Lutherans
Jurists from North Rhine-Westphalia
United States Army personnel of World War II
Ritchie Boys
Burials at Arlington National Cemetery
Jewish emigrants from Nazi Germany to the United States
Protestants in the German Resistance
Military personnel from Essen
People from the Rhine Province
Military personnel from Washington, D.C.
Writers from Washington, D.C.
20th-century Lutherans
United States Army colonels
United States Army reservists